Itasca   is a city in Hill County in Northern Central Texas. As of the 2010 census, the city population was 1,644.

History
Itasca began as a railroad station for the Missouri, Kansas and Texas Railroad in 1881, and was incorporated in 1885.

In the 1984 Willie Nelson film Songwriter, Willie's character mentions as a joke that he's going to "a weavers convention in Itasca, Texas".

Geography

Itasca is located at  (32.158509, –97.147852).

The town's theme seen on some of its signs and its website is the "Big Little Town." Located off I-35W south of Fort Worth, Texas, and north of Waco, Texas, Itasca is the approximate midway point between the two cities.

Demographics

2020 census

As of the 2020 United States census, there were 1,562 people, 580 households, and 363 families residing in the city.

2000 census
As of the census of 2000, there were 1,503 people, 549 households, and 384 families residing in the city. The population density was 1,242.9 people per square mile (479.6/km2). There were 612 housing units at an average density of 506.1 per square mile (195.3/km2). The racial makeup of the city was 64.54% White, 17.03% African American, 0.47% Native American, 0.07% Asian, 16.10% from other races, and 1.80% from two or more races. Hispanic or Latino of any race were 26.41% of the population.

There were 549 households, out of which 32.6% had children under the age of 18 living with them, 51.0% were married couples living together, 13.7% had a female householder with no husband present, and 29.9% were non-families. 25.3% of all households were made up of individuals, and 13.1% had someone living alone who was 65 years of age or older. The average household size was 2.63 and the average family size was 3.17.

In the city, the population was spread out, with 26.2% under the age of 18, 10.0% from 18 to 24, 26.3% from 25 to 44, 19.4% from 45 to 64, and 18.1% who were 65 years of age or older. The median age was 36 years. For every 100 females, there were 98.3 males. For every 100 females age 18 and over, there were 97.3 males.

The median income for a household in the city was $30,050, and the median income for a family was $34,241. Males had a median income of $26,200 versus $22,045 for females. The per capita income for the city was $13,443. About 15.2% of families and 20.0% of the population were below the poverty line, including 29.6% of those under age 18 and 17.2% of those age 65 or over.

Education
The city is served by the Itasca Independent School District. The district has three schools, Itasca High School, Itasca Middle School, and Itasca Elementary School.

Climate
The climate in this area is characterized by hot, humid summers and generally mild to cool winters.  According to the Köppen Climate Classification system, Itasca has a humid subtropical climate, abbreviated "Cfa" on climate maps.

References

External links
 
 Community website
 Itasca ISD
 City-Data.com
 Texas State Historical Association: ITASCA, TX

Cities in Texas
Cities in Hill County, Texas